The 80th Regiment of Foot may refer to:

80th Regiment of Light-Armed Foot, raised in 1758 as an experimental light infantry force by Colonel Thomas Gage for service in the French and Indian War
80th Regiment of Foot (Royal Edinburgh Volunteers), raised in 1778
80th Regiment of Foot (Staffordshire Volunteers), raised in 1793